Anosmin-1 is a secreted, EM associated glycoprotein found in humans and other organisms responsible for normal development, which is expressed in the brain, spinal cord and kidney. Absence or damage to the protein results in Kallmann syndrome in humans, which is characterized by loss of olfactory bulbs and GnRH secretion leading to anosmia and hypothalamic hypogonadotropic hypogonadism. Anosmin-1 is coded by the KAL-1 gene, which is found on the X chromosome. Anosmin-1 is 100 kilodaltons and is expressed on the outside of cells. Because of this and because of its contribution to normal migration of nerve cells, a role in the extracellular matrix has been postulated.

During neural crest cell development, anosmin-1 plays a role in cranial neural cell formation by spatiotemporal regulation.
Secreated anosmin-1 enhances FGF activity by promoting FGF8-FGFR1 complex formation, whereas inhibits both BMP5 and WNT3A activities. 
As a results, orchestrated regulation of FGF, BMP, and WNT by anosmin-1 control EMT and MET during neural crest cell development. 
In human retinal pigment epithelial cell (RPE), the expression of anosmin-1 is regulated by TGF-β which remain to be investigated.

Anosmin-1 is encoded by a gene ANOS1 (earlier called ADMLX, KAL, KAL1, KALIG1). In human it is located on the X chromosome at Xp22.3 and is affected in some male individuals with Kallmann syndrome. This gene codes for a protein of the extracellular matrix named anosmin-1, which is involved in the migration of certain nerve cell precursors (neuroendocrine GnRH cells) during embryogenesis. Deletion or mutation of this gene results in loss of the functional protein and affects the proper development of the olfactory nerves and olfactory bulbs. In addition, neural cells that produce GnRH fail to migrate to the hypothalamus.

Clinically, mutation results in the X-linked form of Kallmann syndrome. Individuals with Kallmann syndrome experience anosmia (lack of smell) and do not go through puberty (hypothalamic hypogonadotropic hypogonadism).

ANOS1 is made of 14 exons and spans 120-200 kilobases. Mutations of ANOS1 may account for 14% of the cases of familial Kallmann syndrome and 11% of male sporadic cases.

References

External links 
  GeneReviews/NCBI/NIH/UW entry on Kallmann syndrome
 NextBio.com
 GenAtlas

Proteins